The Commemorative medal of the 1870–1871 War was a French military campaign medal awarded to those who served during the Franco-Prussian War.

The war, declared by Emperor Napoleon III on Prussia on 19 July 1870, ended in defeat for France and terminated in the Treaty of Frankfurt of 10 May 1871.

Although the bravest were rewarded with the Legion of Honour and the Military Medal, the by-then republican authorities firmly refused to create a commemorative medal for award to the participants of the conflict, possibly in an effort to forget the humiliation and national shame caused by the sad events.  Forty years would have to elapse before the government would agree to a tangible form of recognition for the surviving veterans of the conflict.  The Commemorative medal of the 1870–1871 War was finally established by a law of 9 November 1911.

Award statute
The Commemorative medal of the 1870–1871 War was awarded to veterans of the Franco-Prussian War who could prove with an official document, their service under French colours in France or Algeria, or on board armed naval vessels, between the months of July 1870 and February 1871, in:
the regular army;
the National Guard;  
the Corps-Francs; 
the mobilized National Guard;
the sedentary National Guard of besieged cities;
the sedentary National Guard of open cities;
the Navy;
organized irregular corps (Paris police, forestry agents and guards, customs officials);
the military postal and treasury services;
the sedentary National Guard of open cities, attacked in 1870–71, whose courage was recognized by the government with the addition of the cross of the Legion of Honour in their coats or arms.

The law of 27 March 1912 enlarged this list of potential recipients to include doctors, medics, nurses and chaplains able to prove their presence on the battlefield, in ambulances and hospitals, as well as to balloon pilots who escaped from besieged Paris to carry out a public service.

A decree of 17 September 1921 added all veterans of the war of 1870-1871 that were wounded or maimed in combat, or that particularly distinguished themselves in the face of the enemy, as potential recipients of the Military Medal.

Finally, a new law of 13 July 1923 (published on 17 July 1923) added as recipients:
children under fourteen years of age at the 1870 declaration of war, who volunteered and were enlisted in the battalions of the National Guard to receive the medal with the clasp "ENGAGÉ VOLONTAIRE".  The accompanying scroll will bear the title "ENFANT VOLONTAIRE" as well as the company and battalion numbers.    
children under the age of eighteen who, although not enlisted during the war, accomplished acts of civic courage that could be proven as authentic.

Award description
The Commemorative medal of the 1870–1871 War was a 30-mm-in-diameter circular medal struck from bronze.  Its obverse bore the relief image of the effigy of the "warrior republic" in the form of the left profile of a helmeted woman's bust wearing armour.  On either side, the relief inscription along the outer medal circumference "RÉPUBLIQUE FRANÇAISE".  The reverse bore at its lower center, a rectangle bearing the relief inscription "AUX DÉFENSEURS DE LA PATRIE", superimposed over the relief images of military weapons (sabres, lances, cannons), a naval anchor and a flowing banner, at its top, the relief years "1870 1871" bisected by the banner's mast.

The medal hung from a ribbon passing through a ring itself passing through a ball shaped suspension loop at the top.  The 36-mm-wide green silk moiré ribbon bore four 4-mm-wide equidistant vertical black stripes, the whole forming nine alternating 4 mm stripes.  The clasp "ENGAGÉ VOLONTAIRE" could be worn on the ribbon.

The medal was engraved by artist Georges Lemaire, his model to represent the effigy of the republic was Miss Fernande Dubois, an artist at the Opéra-Comique.

Notable recipients
Marshal Ferdinand Foch
General Émile Zimmer
General Louis Archinard
General Michel-Joseph Maunoury
General Louis François Léon Friant
General Tell Aristide Frédéric Antoine Chapel
General Maurice Bailloud
General Ludovic Hurault de Vibraye
General Édouard Laffon de Ladebat
General Noël Édouard, viscount of Curières and of Castelnau
General Marie Charles Justin Tournier
General George Albert Bazaine-Hayter
General Louis André
General Raoul Le Mouton de Boisdeffre
General Auguste Dubail
General Maurice Balfourier
General Charles-Marie de Braconnier
General Marie Félix Silvestre
General Joseph Joffre
General Alfred Frédéric Philippe Auguste Napoléon Ameil
General Jean Baptiste Jules Carbillet
General Brice Adrien Bizot
Rear admiral Benjamin Jaurès
Colonel Charles Nicolas Friant
Colonel Léon Aurousseau
Captain Pharaon Van Del Bulke
Chaplain Osmin Gardey
Léon de Vesly
Field Marshal Earl Kitchener (who served in a French ambulance unit)

See also

Ems Dispatch
Franco-Prussian War
Austro-Prussian War
Peace of Prague (1866)
Napoleon III
William I, German Emperor
Otto von Bismarck

References

External links
Musée de la Légion d'Honneur

Military awards and decorations of France
Second French Empire
Franco-Prussian War
Awards established in 1911
1911 establishments in France
French campaign medals